Clarke Briar Beard (November 29, 1884 - November, 1978) was an American athlete who competed in the 1908 Summer Olympics in London.

In the 800 metres, Beard won a close race in the first round. His time was 1:59.2. In the final, Beard was disqualified.

References

Notes

Sources

 
 
 

American male middle-distance runners
Athletes (track and field) at the 1908 Summer Olympics
Olympic track and field athletes of the United States
1884 births
1978 deaths
20th-century American people